Frisilia tricrosura is a moth in the family Lecithoceridae. It was described by Chun-Sheng Wu and Kyu-Tek Park in 1999. It is found in Sri Lanka.

The wingspan is 10–12 mm. The forewings are ochreous yellow, speckled with brown scales and with a dot in the cell and a discocellular spot, both brown. The hindwings are light ochreous.

Etymology
The species name is said to be derived from Greek tricros (meaning three forked) and ura (meaning tail). The proper word for “tail” in ancient Greek is however oura (οὐρά).

References

Moths described in 1999
Frisilia